Vestelspor Manisa was a professional basketball club based in Manisa, Turkey that last played in the TB2L.

Notable players

 Justin Knox

References

External links
Team profile at eurobasket.com

Defunct basketball teams in Turkey
Basketball teams established in 1987
Basketball teams disestablished in 2014